Rockwell College, founded in 1864, is a voluntary day and boarding Catholic secondary school near Cashel, County Tipperary in Ireland.

The school has a rugby tradition and has won the Munster Schools Senior Cup 26 times and the Munster Schools Junior Cup 20 times. Rockwell is run by the Spiritans. Its list of former pupils and teachers includes two Presidents of Ireland.

History 

Rockwell College was founded in 1864 by two Spiritan priests (also known as the Holy Ghost Fathers) to provide education to the sons of Roman Catholics during a time when Penal Laws were still in place against the Catholic majority in Ireland.

Rockwell College played an important role in the development of the Irish State in the several prominent figures of the Irish Revolutionary period taught at or attended the school. Éamon de Valera taught mathematics there as a young teacher and fellow 1916 Proclamation signatory Thomas MacDonagh attended as a pupil. In 1964 as part of the centenary celebrations President Éamon de Valera returned to the school, 60 years after he taught there.

In 1997, Pat O'Sullivan became Rockwell's first lay principal, and in 2012 Audrey O'Byrne became the college's first female principal.

Sister schools 
Blackrock College
St Michael's College, Dublin
St Mary's College, Dublin
Templeogue College, Dublin

Notable past pupils

Politics
Tadhg Crowley, Irish revolutionary and Fianna Fáil Senator and TD for Limerick
Éamon de Valera, Taoiseach and President of Ireland, was a mathematics teacher at the school.
Michael Ahern, former Junior Minister for Industry and Commerce and former TD for Cork East
Henry Barniville, Senator and Professor of Anatomy in University College Dublin
Andrew Boylan, former Fine Gael TD for Cavan–Monaghan
Ruairí Brugha, Fianna Fáil TD, Senator and MEP
Patrick Hillery, President of Ireland 1976–1990
Maurice Manning, Chancellor of National University of Ireland, former Fine Gael Senator and President of the Irish Human Rights Commission
Enda Marren, Fine Gael trustee and Member of Irish Council of State
Seán McCarthy, former Minister of State for Finance and Technology
William Quirke, former Fianna Fáil Senator and Tipperary IRA leader during the Irish War of Independence and the Irish Civil War.
Thomas Walsh, former Fianna Fáil TD for Carlow–Kilkenny
James John O'Shee, former member of the Irish Parliamentary Party, MP for the constituency of West Waterford (1895-1918) and co-founder of the Irish Land & Labour Association.

Legal
Fionán Lynch, Circuit Court Judge and Deputy Leader of Fine Gael
David Keane, Judge of the High Court
Mark Heslin, Judge Of the High Court
John Rogers, former Attorney General of Ireland between 1984-1987
John L. Murray, former Chief Justice of Ireland, former judge of the Irish Supreme Court, former judge of the European Court of Justice, former Attorney General of Ireland, and former Chancellor of the University of Limerick
Maurice Collins, Judge of the Supreme Court

Business
Richie Boucher, Chairman at CRH plc
Brody Sweeney, CEO of O'Briens Irish Sandwich Bars and Fine Gael candidate in 2007 election

Sport
Jake Flannery, rugby international
Paddy Butler, rugby player
Jack Clarke, footballer
Michael Dargan, cricketer and rugby player
Willie Duggan, rugby international
Denis Fogarty, rugby player
John Fogarty, rugby international
Gary Halpin, rugby international
Denis Leamy, rugby international
Pat McGrath, hurler
Paul McNaughton, manager of the Irish rugby team
Mark Melbourne, rugby player
Walter Swinburn, jockey, who won 8 British Classics, including the 1981 Derby with Shergar
Conor Sweeney, Tipperary Gaa Football Captain, Winning the 2020 Munster Football Championship
Diarmuid Barron, rugby player

Clergy
Michael Browne
Pádraig de Brún, former president of National University of Ireland, Galway
Denis Fahey
Henry Aloysius Gogarty
Aengus Finucane, former chief executive of Concern Worldwide, was a teacher
Jack Finucane
Archbishop James Leen, Bishop of Port Louis, Mauritius.
John Joseph McCarthy

Others
John Crowley, Irish revolutionary and hunger striker
John J. Collins, Biblical scholar, was a Spiritan for nine years, professor in Yale
John M. Feehan, author and publisher
Thomas MacDonagh - poet, teacher and co-leader of 1916 Rising, for which he was executed.
Colm Mangan - former Chief of Staff of the Irish Defence Forces,
Pádraic Ó Conaire, writer
Liam O'Flaherty, writer
Kevin Roche, architect
Gabriel Rosenstock, writer

References

External links

Rockwell College
Rockwell College Union

Educational institutions established in 1864
Private schools in the Republic of Ireland
Education in County Tipperary
Secondary schools in County Tipperary
Catholic secondary schools in the Republic of Ireland
Spiritan schools
1864 establishments in Ireland